The 2010 Gainesville mayoral election occurred on April 13, 2010. The primary election was on March 16, 2010. The results of the first round pitted Gainesville City Commissioner Craig Lowe against Don Marsh. Craig Lowe narrowly won the general election by a margin of just 42 votes, 0.34%.

Candidates 

 Ozzy Angula
 Monica Leadon Cooper
 Craig Lowe, Gainesville City Commissioner
 Don Marsh
 Richard Selwach

Primary Election

General Election

References 

Mayoral elections
Gainesville, Florida